Oxyopes ceylonicus, is a species of spider of the genus Oxyopes. It is endemic to Sri Lanka.

See also
 List of Oxyopidae species

References

Oxyopidae
Endemic fauna of Sri Lanka
Spiders of Asia
Spiders described in 1892